Gran Hermano 18, also known as Gran Hermano Revolution is the eighteenth and final season of Gran Hermano, the Spanish version of the reality television series franchise Big Brother.

The 18th season started airing on September 19, 2017 on Telecinco with Jorge Javier Vázquez hosting the main live shows or "Galas". The season ended on December 14, 2017 with Hugo Sierra emerging as the winner. At the age of 44, he became the oldest winner of Gran Hermano and the second foreigner to win after Naiala in season 8.

Housemates
On Sunday, September 17, 2017 (Day -2), a total of 100 potential housemates entered the house. It was revealed on the next day, Monday, September 18, 2017, during a special pre-launch show called "Llega La Revolution", that on the following day, September 19, 2017, the actual Live Launch date, that only 20 of the 100 initial candidates would survive the experiment and will become the final housemates of the series. On Launch night, only 18 (Carlos, Carlota, Christian, Cristian, Hugo, Javier, Juan, Laura, Maico, Miguel, Mina, Miriam, Petra, Pilar, Nerea, Rubén, Yangyang & Yolanda) were announced by producers. After the remaining 82 candidates failed to pick one of their own to move-in, the remaining 2 spots were automatically given to the public to choose their favorites (Daniel & José María), who entered on Day 2 (Thursday, September 21, 2017).

Nomination table

Notes

Total votes and nominations received

Debate: Blind results

Repechage 
On Day 44, due to the low number of women in the house, the evicted female housemates faced a public voting and the two with most votes re-entered the house for a week. Laura and Miriam were chosen to re-enter and they could save a nominated housemate along with the rest of female housemates, and they will play a key part in this week's food task. After Jose María's departure, it was announced that Miriam and/or Laura would be given a second chance to enter the house again as official housemates. The public will decide which one will enter, having the chance to vote for the two of them and also for none of them to enter. If one of them enter the house, one housemate will be evicted as a replacement. If both of them enter the house, then two housemates will be evicted.

Twist

You are inside
After the first eviction, every week a viewer chosen by the random phone call from Gran Hermano, will go into the house with the mission of saving one of the nominated housemates. The housemate who receives the next number of nominations will be nominated for eviction.

Ratings

"Galas"

"Debates"

"Última Hora"

Controversies
On 19 November 2019, digital newspaper El Confidencial published a video showing that Carlota Prado would have allegedly been the victim in the house of sexual abuse while drunk, perpetrated by her then partner José María López. Production team continued recording the reaction after showing her the video footage. Many (at least 30) sponsor companies retired advertisement from Gran Hermano VIP 7 after this incident.

References

External links
 Official site on Telecinco.es
 Gran Hermano main site

2017 Spanish television seasons
GH 18